"Fats" Sadi Pol Lallemand (23 October 1927, Andenne, Belgium – 20 February 2009, Huy) was a Belgian jazz musician, vocalist, and composer who played vibraphone and percussion.  He chose the name "Sadi" because he disliked his last name, which means "the German" in French. He led a quartet and nonet and won the Belgian Golden Django for best French-speaking artist in 1996.

Career
His first instrument was xylophone, which he played in a circus in the 1930s. After World War II, he turned professional playing the vibraphonist. He performed with Bobby Jaspar in the Bob Shots, then with Don Byas. From 1950 to 1961, he lived in Paris, where he played with Aimé Barelli, Django Reinhardt, and Martial Solal.

In the 1960s, he moved to Brussels, Belgium, and was a member of Kenny Clarke/Francy Boland Big Band. He worked for RTBF, the TV channel of the French Community in Belgium. Sadi became seriously ill in January 1995 and appeared rarely on stage.

Discography

As leader
 Mr. Fats Sadi, His Vibes and His Friends (MPS, 1966)

As sideman
With Don Byas
 Don Byas featuring Mary Lou Williams & Beryl Booker (Vogue, 1953)
 Memorial (Vogue, 1973)
 Don Byas (Inner City, 1980)

With Kenny Clarke/Francy Boland Big Band
 Handle with Care (Atlantic, 1963)
 Swing, Waltz, Swing (Philips, 1966)
 Sax No End (SABA, 1967)
 Out of the Folk Bag (Columbia, 1967)
 17 Men and Their Music (Campi, 1967)
 Faces (MPS, 1971)

With Bobby Jaspar
 Bobby Jaspar & His Modern Jazz (Vogue)
 Bobby Jaspar/Henri Renaud (Vogue)

With Sahib Shihab
 Seeds (Vogue Schallplatten, 1970)
 Companionship (Vogue Schallplatten, 1971)

With others
 André Hodeir, The Vogue Sessions (Vogue)
 Django Reinhardt, Bruxelles/Paris (Musidisc, 1938–1953)
 Zoot Sims,  Jazz in Paris: Zoot Sims & Henri Renaud (EmArcy)
 Martial Solal, The Complete Vogue Recordings Vol. 2 (Vogue, 1953–56) – Quartet co-led by Fats Sadi

References

External links
 Discography
 Page on jazzinbelgium.com

1927 births
2009 deaths
People from Andenne
20th-century Belgian male singers
20th-century Belgian singers
Belgian composers
Male composers
Belgian male musicians
Belgian jazz musicians
Belgian jazz singers
Blue Note Records artists
Jazz vibraphonists
Kenny Clarke/Francy Boland Big Band members